Dana P. Pagett (born March 29, 1949) is an American retired professional basketball player who spent one season in the American Basketball Association (ABA) as a member of the Virginia Squires during the 1971–72 season. He attended University of Southern California where he was drafted by the Philadelphia 76ers during the eleventh round of the 1971 NBA Draft. After that season he signed with the Portland Trail Blazers, but was released before the start of the 1972–73 National Basketball Association (NBA) season. He was an assistant coach for the Loyola Marymount Lions, Long Beach State 49ers and Utah State Aggies men's basketball teams. He was also the assistant coach for Rancho Santiago Community College District men's basketball team and was later promoted to the head coach position.

References

External links
 

1949 births
Living people
American men's basketball players
Basketball players from California
Junior college men's basketball coaches in the United States
Long Beach State Beach men's basketball coaches
Loyola Marymount Lions men's basketball coaches
Philadelphia 76ers draft picks
USC Trojans men's basketball players
Utah State Aggies men's basketball coaches
Virginia Squires players